Choi Ho-jung ( born 8 December 1989) is a South Korean football player who plays for Jeonnam Dragons.

Club career 
Choi started his career at Daegu FC, joining in 2010 K League Draft. He made his debut in a match against Incheon United on 24 April 2010 and promptly earned himself a yellow card.

Club career statistics

References

External links

1989 births
Living people
South Korean footballers
Association football midfielders
Daegu FC players
Gimcheon Sangmu FC players
Seongnam FC players
Seoul E-Land FC players
FC Anyang players
Jeonnam Dragons players
K League 1 players
K League 2 players